Sandrine Mauron (born 19 December 1996) is a Swiss footballer who plays as a midfielder for German Frauen-Bundesliga club Eintracht Frankfurt and the Switzerland national team.

Career

Club
Mauron started her professional career at FC Yverdon Féminin, a team playing in the Nationalliga A, the highest-level league competition for women's football clubs in Switzerland. In 2014, she moved to Swiss traditional club FC Zürich. With the team, Mauron was twice national champions and won two national cups. She also played in four consecutive editions of the UEFA Champions League.

International
Mauron was part of the squad that represented Switzerland at 2013 UEFA Women's Under-17 Championship qualification when she played six matches and scored two goals. With the U19 team, Mauron played in the 2015 UEFA Women's Under-19 Championship qualification and the 2016 UEFA Women's Under-19 Championship qualification. In the 2016 edition, Switzerland was able to qualify for the final tournament reaching the semi-finals when they were defeated by France, that would eventually win the tournament. In 2015, Mauron was called for Swiss Senior Team for the first time. In 2016, she made her debut for the team. On 23 October 2016, in a friendly match against United States, she scored her first international goal. On 3 July 2017 Calligaris was called by coach Martina Voss-Tecklenburg to represent Switzerland at the UEFA Women's Euro 2017, but she didn't play any matches as Switzerland was eliminated still in the tournament's group stage.

Notes

References

External links
 
 Player's Profile at Swiss Football Association
 

1996 births
Living people
Switzerland women's international footballers
Swiss women's footballers
Swiss expatriate sportspeople in Germany
Women's association football midfielders
People from Yverdon-les-Bains
1. FFC Frankfurt players
Eintracht Frankfurt (women) players
Frauen-Bundesliga players
FC Zürich Frauen players
Swiss Women's Super League players
Sportspeople from the canton of Vaud
UEFA Women's Euro 2022 players
UEFA Women's Euro 2017 players
Expatriate women's footballers in Germany
Swiss expatriate women's footballers